The 1913 Richmond Spiders football team was an American football team that represented Richmond College—now known as the University of Richmond—as a member of the Eastern Virginia Intercollegiate Athletic Association (EVIAA) during the 1913 college football season. Led by first-year head coach Frank Dobson, Richmond compiled an overall record of 5–3–1 with a mark of 3–0 in conference play, winning the EVIAA title.

Schedule

References

Richmond
Richmond Spiders football seasons
Richmond Spiders football